The 2014 Camping World RV Sales 301 was a NASCAR Sprint Cup Series stock car race that was held on July 13, 2014, at New Hampshire Motor Speedway in Loudon, New Hampshire. Contested over 301 laps, it was the 19th race of the 2014 NASCAR Sprint Cup Series season. This race was the final NASCAR broadcast for TNT, ending a 32-year broadcast partnership with Turner Sports. Brad Keselowski won the race after leading 138 laps. Kyle Busch was second, while Kyle Larson (finishing as the best rookie), Matt Kenseth, and Ryan Newman rounded out the top five. Behind Larson, the top rookies of the race were Austin Dillon in 14th, and Cole Whitt in 28th.

Previous week's race
Aric Almirola scored his first career victory in the rain-shortened Coke Zero 400 at Daytona International Speedway. He said he could not "dream" of a better place to get his first win.

Report

Background

The track's turns are banked at two to seven degrees, while the front stretch, the finish line, and the back stretch are banked at one degree and are 1,500 feet in length. The track has a grandstand seating capacity of 93,521 spectators. Brian Vickers was the defending race winner from the 2013 race.

Entry list
The entry list for the Camping World RV Sales 301 was released on Tuesday, July 8, 2014 at 11:18 a.m. Eastern time. Forty-three drivers were entered for the race.

Practice

First practice
Joey Logano crashed his car in turn one after blowing a left-rear tire; he likened the blowout to a similar occurrence in the race in 2013, adding that he was not "even close to saving that. I needed about 500 more yards of straightaway to save that one".

Qualifying

After qualifying second, Johnson stated that "it's so tough to get a good lap around here...but Kyle found a little bit more out there than us".

Qualifying results

Practice (post-qualifying)

Second practice
Aric Almirola was forced to unload his backup car after suffering a left-rear tire blowout like Logano and crashing in turn three. Almirola was perplexed as to the reason why the blowout occurred, describing the situation as "weird".

Final practice

Race

First half
The race was scheduled to start at 1:16 p.m. Eastern time, but the start was delayed by a few minutes due to technical difficulties before the pre-race command. Kyle Busch eventually led the field to the start. Jimmie Johnson had to make an unscheduled stop for a flat left-rear tire on lap seven, losing a lap in the process. A second blowout for Johnson – a left-front tire – five laps later, saw him hit the wall and brought out the first caution of the race on lap 14. The damage to the car ended Johnson's race, scored in 42nd position. The race restarted on lap 21 with Busch leading the field; he held the lead until the 63rd lap, when his Joe Gibbs Racing teammate Denny Hamlin assumed the lead. Hamlin gave up the lead on lap 74 to make his first stop, and Brad Keselowski assumed the lead. Keselowski ceded the lead to Kyle Larson when he made his pit stop, before the lead cycled back to Hamlin at the completion of green flag pit stops.

Second half

Keselowski retook the lead on lap 90, and held the lead until the second caution of the race on lap 112, caused by debris. Keselowski lost the lead during the pit cycle; he was beaten out of the pits by Kyle Busch, but Larson had stayed out and assumed the lead. Larson led the field to the restart on lap 119, holding the lead until lap 127, when Matt Kenseth took the lead. On lap 139, Keselowski returned to the lead of the race, and maintained his position until the third caution period of the race, due to debris on the backstretch on lap 153. Joey Logano took the lead during the pit stops, but lost the lead to Clint Bowyer at the restart on lap 158. Keselowski retook the lead on lap 177, just as another debris caution was called for. Keselowski maintained his lead for the next stint of the race, before the caution flag was flown again, on lap 212.

On this occasion, the caution period was down to a collision in turn three, between Logano and Morgan Shepherd, who at 72, was further extending his record of being the oldest driver to compete in a Sprint Cup race. Logano complained that he had “just got taken out by the slowest guy out there", while also stating that NASCAR should implement a driver's test. NASCAR defended Shepherd, saying he passed all the requirements, had his speed monitored, and ran well enough in relation to the leaders not to be black-flagged. NASCAR required that a driver run within 115% of the fastest final practice lap, which was 32.87 seconds at Loudon. Shepherd was well within the limits, running 31-second laps. Shepherd would ultimately finish the race as the last car running, 27 laps down in 39th position. During the pit stops, Bowyer exited first, and led the field to the restart on lap 219.

Final laps
Keselowski retook the lead on lap 230, holding the lead to the sixth caution of the race, on lap 249 for debris. Jeff Gordon stayed out while the leaders pitted and assumed the lead. Gordon held the lead until 32 laps to go, when Keselowski returned to the lead of the race. Keselowski maintained his lead until the end, despite a seventh caution – which caused a green–white–checker finish – with four laps to go, when Justin Allgaier hit the wall in turn three. Keselowski held off the advances of Kyle Busch to win for the second time in three races, and for the third time in 2014. Keselowski described the performance as "definitely good for when we come back here in September", but also stated that his team "have to keep working and plugging away". Gordon maintained his championship lead, despite running out of fuel in the closing stages, and ultimately finished 26th.

Race results

Race statistics
 Lead changes: 18 among different drivers
 Cautions/Laps: 7 for 35
 Red flags: 0
 Time of race: 2 hours, 58 minutes and 3 seconds
 Average speed:

Media

Television

Radio

Standings after the race

Drivers' Championship standings

Manufacturers' Championship standings

Note: Only the first sixteen positions are included for the driver standings.

Notes

References

Camping World RV Sales 301
Camping World RV Sales 301
Camping World RV Sales 301
NASCAR races at New Hampshire Motor Speedway